Folk Dranouter is a yearly folk festival spanning four days at the beginning of August in the Belgian village Dranouter. Since 2005, a second, smaller festival, Dranouter aan zee (Dranouter at sea) is organised in De Panne on the beach near the end of April.

History
Created in 1975 by the people of the youth club "De Zon", the first festival showed eight groups on one day with the Albion Morris Men as headliners, and had some 300 visitors. By 1977, the festival had specialized in folk music and got some 1,000 visitors. After a few more years of growth, the festival reached a stable audience of three- to five thousand visitors throughout the 1980s.

From the end of the 1980s on, the festival started programming other genres like world music (with Miriam Makeba in 1989) and singer-songwriters (with Billy Bragg in 1988), and included some more well-known names. The audience increased to some 45,000 people in 1995 and 65,000 in 1997.

In 1997 and 1998, Dranouter won the ZAMU award for best musical event.

Folk museum
In the wake of the festival, a museum of folk music also opened in Dranouter.

Artists
Famous artists who performed in Dranouter over the years include:

1975–1987
Derroll Adams (1976, 1981, 1991)
Wannes Van de Velde (1977, 1979, 1982, 1987, 1996)
Dick Gaughan (1979)
Paddy Glackin (1982)
Fairport Convention (1983, 1993, 2000)
The Chieftains (1983, 1997, 2000, 2009)
Alan Stivell (1983, 1989, 1994, 2000, 2004)
The Dubliners (1984, 1991)
Brenda Wootton (1985)
Ossian (1985)
Zachary Richard (1985)
Kate & Anna McGarrigle (1986, 1995)
Flaco Jiménez (1986)
John Prine (1987)
Steeleye Span (1987, 1994, 1999)

1988
Mary Coughlan & Band
Ralph McTell
Billy Bragg (also 1993, 2008, 2014)
Malicorne
Rory McLeod (also 1994) & Kathryn Tickell 
Dónal Lunny (also 1998) & Liam O'Flynn

1989
Miriam Makeba
Richard Thompson (also 1992, 2000, 2009, 2014)
Alan Stivell
Soldat Louis
Värttinä

1990
Donovan
Johannes Kerkorrel (also 1997, 2002)
June Tabor
Luka Bloom (also 1994, 2006, 2011)
Rory Block

1991
Dan Ar Braz
Melanie (also 1995)
Suzanne Vega (also 1997, 2002, 2008)

1992
Christy Moore (also 1994, 2005)
Geoffrey Oryema
Kirsty MacColl
Les Négresses Vertes (also 2007)
Marianne Faithfull (also 2005)
Pentangle
Värttinä (also 1997, 2002, 2008)
Zap Mama (also 1995, 2006)

1993
Altan (also 1997, 2007)
Cesária Évora
Indigo Girls (also 2002)
Loreena McKennitt (also 2008)
Michelle Shocked
Mikis Theodorakis
The Pogues (also 2010)

1994
Lloyd Cole
Joan Baez
Guo Yue
Eleanor McEvoy
Angelo Branduardi
Khaled

1995
Ry Cooder & David Lindley (with Joachim Cooder and Rosanna Lindley) (USA)
Los Lobos (USA)
Kate & Anna McGarrigle (Canada)
Melanie (USA)
Zap Mama (Zaire)
Mary Black (Ireland)
Shawn Colvin (USA)
Songhai (Mali/Spain/Great Britain)
Giora Feidman (USA)
Gabriel Yacoub (France)
Shane MacGowan and The Popes (Great Britain)
Taraf de Haïdouks (Romania)
Khadja Nin (Burundi)
Jo Lemaire (Belgium)
The Equation (Great Britain)
Cordelia's Dad (USA)
JPP (Finland)

1996
Elvis Costello
Emmylou Harris (also 2006)
Yannis Markopoulos (also 2004)
Clannad
Cowboy Junkies
Maria McKee
Janis Ian
Huun-Huur-Tu (also 2003)
Cassandra Wilson
The Corrs
Ani di Franco

1997
Sinéad O'Connor (also 2007)
The Levellers (also 1999, 2003, 2007)
Noa
Axelle Red (also 2000, 2007)
Mari Boine
Hedningarna
Davy Spillane
Afro Celt Sound System (also 1999)
Beth Orton (also 1998, 2003)

1998
Ali Farka Touré
Kodo
Heather Nova
Patti Smith
Dulce Pontes
Van Morrison
Martha Wainwright (also 2008)
Donal Lunny
Lunasa
The Nits

1999
I Muvrini
Nick Cave
Baaba Maal
Rubén González
James Taylor
John Hiatt
Värttinä
Kepa Junkera
Afro Celt Sound System
Shooglenifty

2000
Mediæval Bæbes
16 Horsepower
Lou Reed (also 2005)
Robert Plant

2001
Novastar (also 2005, 2009, 2014)
Paul Weller
Youssou N'Dour
Capercaillie
The Waterboys
Neil Finn
Luar na Lubre
Admiral Freebee (also 2003, 2007)
Flip Kowlier (also 2003, 2005, 2009, 2014)
Maddy Prior

2002
Patti Smith
Ray Davies
Buena Vista Social Club (also 2005)
Femi Kuti
Hothouse Flowers

2003
Hooverphonic (also 2006)
Gotan Project
Linda Thompson
Daniel Lanois
Arno (also 2007)
Elliott Murphy
Gabriel Ríos (also 2006, 2008, 2014)

2004
Starsailor (also 2007)
Calexico
Goran Bregović
Moya Brennan
The Skatalites
Under byen
Daan (also 2006, 2010)

2005
Yann Tiersen
Jah Wobble
The Proclaimers
Lou Reed

2006
Ed Harcourt
John Cale
Lambchop
Jamie Cullum
John Parish

2007
Isobel Campbell
Mark Lanegan
Lisa Germano

2008
Tori Amos
Howe Gelb

2009
K's Choice
Travis
CocoRosie
Flogging Molly
Milow
Iva Bittová

2010
Tom McRae
Nouvelle Vague
Paolo Conte
Absynthe Minded
Staff Benda Bilili
Vaya Con Dios
La Bottine Souriante
James Walsh
Anouk
Tindersticks
dEUS
Joan as Police Woman
Carolina Chocolate Drops
Harper Simon
Solomon Burke & The Souls Alive Orchestra with Special Guest Joss Stone

References

External links

Folk music centre Dranouter

Music festivals established in 1975
Folk festivals in Belgium
Heuvelland
Summer events in Belgium